The Jimmy Durante Stakes is a Grade III American Thoroughbred horse race for two-year-old  fillies over a distance of one mile on the turf track scheduled annually in November at Del Mar Racetrack in Del Mar, California. The event currently carries a purse of $100,000.

History

The event was inaugurated on 19 December 1990 as the Miesque Stakes at Hollywood Park Racetrack as a race for three year old fillies over a distance of  miles and was won by Dead Heat in a time of 1:41 flat. The following year the event was restricted to two-year-old fillies and the distance was decreased to one mile.

The event was named in honor of the mare Miesque, who won the Breeders' Cup Mile twice and was the United States Champion Female Turf Horse in 1987 and 1988.

In 1995 the event was classified as Grade III.

The 2005 edition of the Miesque Stakes had to be canceled because the newly planted Hollywood Park's turf course had failed to root properly.

When Hollywood Park closed in 2013, the race was renamed in honor of the actor Jimmy Durante as part of a Del Mar rebranding initiative to evoke "old Hollywood cool".

Records
Speed  record:
 1:34.30 - Antespend (1995)

Margins:
 lengths – Here's to You  (1998)

Most wins by a Jockey:
 3 - Eddie Delahoussaye (1991, 1996, 1998)
 3 - Corey Nakatani (1993, 2001, 2004)

Most wins by a trainer:
 4 - Robert J. Frankel (1992, 1997, 2000, 2004)

Most wins by an Owner
 2 - Agri-Harvest   (1997, 2000)
 2 - Godolphin Racing (2018, 2019)

Winners

Legend:

 
 

Notes:

§ Ran as an entry

See also
 List of American and Canadian Graded races

External links
 2020 Del Mar Media Guide

References

Horse races in California
Del Mar Racetrack
Flat horse races for two-year-old fillies
Turf races in the United States
Graded stakes races in the United States
Recurring events established in 1990
1990 establishments in California
Grade 3 stakes races in the United States